Modrow is a surname. Notable people with the surname include:

 Ernst-Wilhelm Modrow (1908–1990), German World War II flying ace
 Hans Modrow (1928–2023), German politician

See also
 Modrý

German-language surnames
Surnames from nicknames